Central Catholic High School is a parochial, Roman Catholic high school in Wheeling, West Virginia. It is part of the Roman Catholic Diocese of Wheeling-Charleston.

Central Catholic High School has been educating young men and women since 1865. The school is a part of the Diocese of Wheeling-Charleston campus, which includes the Cathedral of St. Joseph, the diocesan offices, and the chancery.

At the end of the 2016–2017 school year, Bishop Donahue Memorial High School closed and merged into Central Catholic.

Athletics
Central's athletic teams are called the Maroon Knights. They include:
Boys: football, hockey, basketball, soccer, lacrosse, baseball, wrestling
Girls: football, cheerleading, volleyball, soccer, basketball,  softball
All: tennis, track and field, cross-country, swimming, golf, bowling, archery
Club sports: ice hockey

State championships

Football: 1979, 2000, 2002, 2004, 2005, 2006, 2007, 2010, 2011, 2017, 2018, 2019
Softball: 1995, 1996, 1997, 1998, 1999, 2000, 2001, 2006, 2007, 2016, 2017, 2018
Cheering: 1999, 2000, 2001, 2002, 2004, 2008
Baseball:	1999, 2000, 2005, 2007, 2008, 2011
Boys basketball: State Catholic Championships: 1938, 1939, 1941, 1942, 1943, 1944, 1945, 1946, 1947, 1949, 1950, 1951, 1952, 1953, 1956, 1958, 1959, 1962, 1963, 1964, 1966. WV ‘AA’ State Championships: 1982, 1987, 1990. WV ‘A’ State Championships: 1996, 2002, 2003, 2004, 2005, 2008, 2009, 2014, 2018
Girls basketball: 2004, 2005, 2006, 2007, 2008, 2018
Golf: 2000, 2004, 2006, 2018
Girls tennis: 2005
Boys track: 2005, 2008
Hockey: 2007, 2010, 2011, 2012, 2016, 2017, 2018
Lacrosse: 2010, 2016, 2019
Girls Track: 2017

Notable alumni
 John Corbett, actor
 Joe DeNardo, Pittsburgh meteorologist
 Mike Florio, sportswriter
 Bill Gompers, football player
 Johnny Pramesa, former professional baseball player (Cincinnati Reds, Chicago Cubs)
Doug Wojcik, college basketball coach
Dave Wojcik, college basketball coach

See also
 Wheeling, West Virginia – education
 Ohio County, West Virginia – education

External links
 
 West Virginia High School sports championship lists

References

Roman Catholic Diocese of Wheeling-Charleston
Catholic secondary schools in West Virginia
Buildings and structures in Wheeling, West Virginia
Educational institutions established in 1853
1853 establishments in Virginia
Schools in Ohio County, West Virginia